Brachmia procursella is a moth of the family Gelechiidae. It is found in Austria, Switzerland, Italy, Hungary, Romania and Russia.

References

Moths described in 1903
Brachmia
Moths of Europe